This is a list of Dutch television related events from 1979.

Events

Debuts

Television shows

1950s
NOS Journaal (1956–present)
Pipo de Clown (1958–present)

1970s
Sesamstraat (1976–present)

Ending this year

Births
12 January - Johnny de Mol, actor & TV presenter
15 February - Chantal Janzen, actress & TV presenter

Deaths